Plegiocidaris is an extinct genus of echinoids that lived from the Triassic to the Early Cretaceous.  Its remains have been found in  Asia and Europe.
It was named by the paleontologist Auguste Pomel

Sources

 Fossils (Smithsonian Handbooks) by David Ward (Page 175)

External links
Plegiocidaris in the Paleobiology Database

Prehistoric echinoid genera
Cidaroida genera
Triassic echinoderms
Jurassic echinoderms
Cretaceous echinoderms
Mesozoic animals of Asia
Prehistoric animals of Europe
Triassic first appearances
Early Cretaceous genus extinctions
Fossil taxa described in 1883